The Scotter Baronetcy, of Surbiton in the County of Sussex, was a title in the Baronetage of the United Kingdom.  It was created on 16 July 1907 for the railway manager Sir Charles Scotter.  The title became extinct on the death of the second Baronet in 1911.

Scotter baronets, of Surbiton (1907)
Sir Charles Scotter, 1st Baronet (1835–1910)
Sir Frederick Charles Scotter, 2nd Baronet (1868–1911)

Extinct baronetcies in the Baronetage of the United Kingdom